The men's doubles table tennis event was part of the table tennis programme and took place between October 7 and 8, at the Dongchun Gymnasium, Ulsan.

Schedule
All times are Korea Standard Time (UTC+09:00)

Results

Finals

Top half

Section 1

Section 2

Bottom half

Section 3

Section 4

References 

2002 Asian Games Official Reports, Page 711
Official Website

Table tennis at the 2002 Asian Games